Essex is a county in the East of England which originated as the ancient Kingdom of Essex and one of the seven kingdoms, or heptarchy, that went on to form the Kingdom of England.

Origins 
The name Essex derives from the Kingdom of the East Seaxe or Kingdom of Essex  which was traditionally founded by Aescwine in AD 527, occupying territory to the north of the River Thames and east of the River Lea.

In AD 825 it became part of the Kingdom of Wessex and was later ceded under the Treaty of Wedmore to the Danelaw under the Kingdom of East Anglia. In AD 991 the Battle of Maldon resulted in complete defeat of the Anglo-Saxons by the Vikings, and is commemorated in the poem The Battle of Maldon.

Hundreds 

The county was divided into the hundreds of:

Barstable
Becontree
Chafford
Chelmsford
Clavering
Dengie
Dunmow
Freshwell
Harlow
Havering Liberty
Hinkford
Lexden
Ongar
Rochford
Tendring
Thurstable
Uttlesford
Waltham
Winstree
Witham

Pre-Roman 
The area which Essex now occupies was ruled before Roman settlement by the Celtic Trinovantes tribe. A dispute between them and the Catuvellauni was used as an excuse for a Roman invasion in 54 BC, and they allied with Rome when Claudius returned in AD 43. This led to Camulodunum (Colchester) becoming the capital of Roman Britain. The Trinovantes later fought with the Iceni tribe against Roman rule.
The coast and river estuaries of Iron Age Essex were home to many Red hill sites for evaporating sea water to obtain salt, many of which are still visible in the coastal landscape.

Norman Essex 

Following the Norman conquest the Saxon kingdom formed the basis of a county in 1139 under the first Earl of Essex, Geoffrey de Mandeville. As a county Essex had administrative, political and legal functions.

Victorian era 

Much of the development of the county was caused by the railway. By 1843 the Eastern Counties Railway had connected Bishopsgate station in London with Brentwood and Colchester. In 1856, they opened a branch to Loughton (later extended to Ongar) and by 1884 the London, Tilbury and Southend Railway had connected Fenchurch Street railway station in the City of London to Grays, Tilbury, Southend-on-Sea and Shoeburyness. Some of the railways were built primarily to transport goods but some (e.g. the Loughton branch) were to cater for commuter traffic; they unintentionally created the holiday resorts of Southend, Clacton and Frinton-on-Sea.

County councils were created in England in 1889. Essex County Council was based in Chelmsford, although it met in London until 1938. Its control did not cover the entire county. The London suburb of West Ham and later East Ham and the resort of Southend-on-Sea became county boroughs independent of county council control.

Districts in 1894

Post war 

Much of Essex is protected from development near to its boundary with Greater London and forms part of the Metropolitan Green Belt. In 1949 the new towns of Harlow and Basildon were created. These developments were intended to address the chronic housing shortage in London but were not intended to become dormitory towns, rather it was hoped the towns would form an economy independent of the capital. The railway station at Basildon, with a direct connection to the City, was not opened until 1974 after pressure from residents. 

The proximity of London and its economic magnetism has caused many places in Essex to become desirable places for workers in the City of London to live. As London grew in the east places such as Barking and Romford were given greater autonomy and created as municipal boroughs.

Finally in 1965 under the London Government Act 1963 the County Borough of West Ham and the County Borough of East Ham were abolished and their area transferred to Greater London to form the London Borough of Newham.

Also at this time the Municipal Borough of Ilford and the Municipal Borough of Wanstead and Woodford were abolished and their area, plus part of the area of Chigwell Urban District (but not including Chigwell itself), were transferred to Greater London to form the London Borough of Redbridge. The Municipal Borough of Romford and Hornchurch Urban District were abolished and their area transferred to Greater London to form the London Borough of Havering. 

The Municipal Borough of Leyton, the Municipal Borough of Chingford and the Municipal Borough of Walthamstow were abolished and their area transferred to Greater London to form the London Borough of Waltham Forest. The Municipal Borough of Barking and the Municipal Borough of Dagenham were abolished and their area transferred to Greater London to form the London Borough of Barking and Dagenham.

Recent history 

Essex became part of the East of England Government Office Region in 1994 and was statistically counted as part of that region from 1999, having previously been part of the South East England region.

In 1998 the boroughs of Thurrock and Southend-on-Sea were given unitary authority status and ceased to be under county council control. They remain part of the ceremonial county.

Historical buildings 

The importance of the Anglo-Saxon culture in Essex was only emphasized by the rich burial discovered at Prittlewell recently. But the important Anglo-Saxon remains in Essex are mostly churches. St.Peter's straddles the wall of a Roman seafort at Bradwell (Othona), and is one of the early Anglo-Saxon, "Kentish" series of churches made famous by its documentation by Bede. Later Anglo-Saxon work may be seen in an important church tower at Holy Trinity, Colchester, an intact church at Hadstock, and elsewhere. At Greensted the walls of the nave are made of halved logs; although still the oldest church timber known in England, it is now thought to be early Norman.

Being a relatively stone-less County, it is unsurprising that some of the earliest examples of the mediaeval revival of brick-making can be found in Essex; Layer Marney Tower, Ingatestone Hall, and numerous parish churches exhibit the brickmakers' and bricklayers' skills in Essex. A two-volume typology of bricks, based entirely on Essex examples, has been published. Similarly, spectacular early-mediaeval timber construction is to be found in Essex, with perhaps the two Templars' barns at Cressing Temple being pre-eminent in the whole of England. There is a complete
tree-ring dating series for Essex timber, much due to the work of Dr. Tyers at the University of Sheffield.

Mediaeval "gothic" architecture in timber, brick, rubble, and stone is to be found all over Essex. These range from the large churches at Chelmsford, Saffron Walden and Thaxted, to the little gem at Tilty. The ruined abbeys, however, such as the two in Colchester and that at Barking, are disappointing in comparison to those that can be found in other counties; Waltham is the exception.

While the truncated remnant of Waltham Abbey was considered as a potential cathedral, elevation of the large parish church at Chelmsford was eventually preferred because of its location at the centre of the new diocese of Essex c.1908. Waltham Abbey remains the County's most impressive piece of mediaeval architecture.

Quite apart from important towns like Colchester or Chelmsford, many smaller places in Essex exhibit continuity from ancient times. Perhaps the most amusing is the Anglo-Saxon church at Rivenhall, just north of Witham. A nearby, ruined Roman villa probably served as a source for its building materials, and the age of this church was underestimated by Pevsner by about a thousand years.

The villages of Wanstead and Woodford saw the French family setting up a brick making works adjacent to the road from Chelmsford to London, now known as Chigwell Road. This industry closed in 1952.

References

Further reading 
Pevsner (the "Buildings of England" series, Penguin) is the best general introduction to the County's architecture. In the new editions, 'London over the border' will now appear with London: East, instead of with the rest of the County, as formerly.

Hidden Heritage – Discovering Ancient Essex, by Terry Johnson
by Terry Johnson 
Whilst major sites such as Stonehenge and Avebury are well known, few people realise how rich in ancient sites are other areas of Britain. Terry first examines features of the landscape and unusual church carvings in general, then gives a detailed listing of interesting sites in Essex with associated legends and folklore, in addition to examining possible leys. 

 
Essex